In molecular biology, the interferon-inducible GTPase (IIGP) family of proteins is thought to play a role in intracellular defence. IIGP is predominantly associated with the Golgi apparatus and also localises to the endoplasmic reticulum and exerts a distinct role in IFN-induced intracellular membrane trafficking or processing.

Members of this family include interferon-inducible GTPase 5 and immunity-related GTPase family M protein.

References

Protein families